Of Mice and Men is a 1968 TV film. It was an adaptation of Of Mice and Men by John Steinbeck. It was part of ABC's "Theatre Nights".

Cast
George Segal as George
Nicol Williamson as Lennie
Dana Elcar
Will Geer as Candy
Don Gordon as Curly
Moses Gunn as Crooks
James Hall		
Joey Heatherton as Curly's Wife
Donald Moffat as Slim
John Randolph

Production
The text was censored for television.

References

External links

1968 television films
1968 films
American television films
1960s English-language films
Films directed by Ted Kotcheff